The 122 Squadron of the Israeli Air Force, also known as the Nahshon Squadron (former Dakota Squadron), is a G550 squadron based at Nevatim Airbase.

History
The Squadron has six planes with three aircraft used for Airborne early warning and control (CAEW or Conformal Airborne Early Warning, IAI EL/W-2085) and three are used for Signals intelligence (SEMA or Special Electronic Missions Aircraft).

The Squadron formerly operated Douglas DC-3 aircraft until 2000.

References

Israeli Air Force squadrons